Ibrahim ibn Muhammad Al ash-Sheikh  was a leading Salafi scholar in Saudi Arabia and minister of justice between 1975 and 1990.

Background 
Ibrahim ibn Muhammad Al ash-Sheikh was born into the noted family of Saudi religious scholars, the Al ash-Sheikh, descendants of Muhammad ibn Abd al-Wahhab, the influential Muslim scholar. He was the eldest son of Muhammad ibn Ibrahim Al ash-Sheikh, Grand Mufti of Saudi Arabia until 1969.

Career
Ibrahim ibn Muhammad was one of the most influential religious leaders in the early 1970s. He maintained a close relationship with King Faisal, with whom he met on a weekly basis. He believed that Saudi Arabia should take a leading role in the Arab world and pushed for Saudi involvement in war with Israel.

Between 1975 and 1990, he served as minister of justice.

Family
His brother Abdullah ibn Muhammad Al ash-Sheikh, a younger son of the late Grand Mufti, also served as minister of justice, from 1993 to 2009. His grandson Turki is a lawyer practicing in London and Riyadh.

References

Ibrahim
Saudi Arabian Wahhabists
Government ministers of Saudi Arabia
Saudi Arabian Sunni Muslim scholars of Islam